Rakitny (masculine), Rakitnaya (feminine), or Rakitnoye (neuter) is the name of several inhabited localities in Russia.

Urban localities
Rakitnoye, Belgorod Oblast, a work settlement in Rakityansky Settlement Okrug of Rakityansky District, Belgorod Oblast

Rural localities
Rakitny, Chelyabinsk Oblast, a settlement in Krasnooktyabrsky Selsoviet of Varnensky District of Chelyabinsk Oblast
Rakitny, Kemerovo Oblast, a settlement in Chkalovskaya Rural Territory of Leninsk-Kuznetsky District of Kemerovo Oblast
Rakitny, Rostov Oblast, a khutor under the administrative jurisdiction of  Zernogradskoye Urban Settlement of Zernogradsky District, Rostov Oblast
Rakitnoye, Amur Oblast, a selo in Novoalexeyevsky Rural Settlement of Ivanovsky District of Amur Oblast
Rakitnoye, Kaliningrad Oblast, a settlement in Krasnotorovsky Rural Okrug of Zelenogradsky District of Kaliningrad Oblast
Rakitnoye, Kaluga Oblast, a village in Sukhinichsky District of Kaluga Oblast
Rakitnoye, Khabarovsk Krai, a selo in Khabarovsky District of Khabarovsk Krai
Rakitnoye, Orenburg Oblast, a settlement in Krasnomayaksky Selsoviet of Sol-Iletsky District of Orenburg Oblast
Rakitnoye, Primorsky Krai, a selo in Dalnerechensky District of Primorsky Krai
Rakitnoye, Voronezh Oblast, a settlement in Volenskoye Rural Settlement of Novousmansky District of Voronezh Oblast
Rakitnaya, a village in Uzkinsky Selsoviet of Znamensky District of Oryol Oblast